In baseball, the squeeze play (a.k.a. squeeze bunt) is a maneuver consisting of a sacrifice bunt with a runner on third base. The batter bunts the ball, expecting to be thrown out at first base, but providing the runner on third base an opportunity to score. Such a bunt is most common with one out.  According to Baseball Almanac, the squeeze play was invented in 1894 by George Case and Dutch Carter during a college game at Yale University.

In a safety squeeze, the runner at third takes a lead, but does not run towards homeplate until the batter makes contact bunting.

In a suicide squeeze, the runner takes off as soon as the pitcher begins the windup to throw the pitch, and before releasing the ball. If properly executed, and the batter bunts the ball nearly anywhere in fair territory on the ground, a play at home plate is extremely unlikely. However, if the batter misses the ball the runner will likely be tagged out, and if the batter pops the ball up a double play is likely.

These plays are often used in the late innings of a close game to score a tying, winning, or insurance run.  A pitcher's typical defense against a squeeze play, if he sees the batter getting into position to attempt a bunt, is to throw a high pitch that is difficult to bunt on the ground.

References

Baseball terminology
Baseball plays